Otto Wiegand may refer to:
 Otto Wiegand (gymnast), German gymnast
 Otto Oscar Wiegand, member of the Wisconsin State Assembly